Griesel is a surname. Notable people with the surname include:

Abrie Griesel (born 1992), South African rugby union player
Izette Griesel (born 1992), South African netball player
Jeannette Griesel (born 1982), German businesswoman and entrepreneur
Werner Griesel (born 1986), South African rugby union player